Brigadier Herbert Cecil Duncan (19 August 1895 – 20 January 1942) was a British Indian Army officer who commanded the 45th Indian Infantry Brigade during the Battle of Malaya prior to the Fall of Singapore.

Military career
Commissioned a temporary second lieutenant in the Seaforth Highlanders in 1914, Duncan received a permanent commission in the British Indian Army as a lieutenant in 1918. His service in the First World War earned him a Mention in Despatches. Having the 13th Frontier Force Rifles as his maternal British Indian Army unit, he eventually served from 1931 onwards as a General Staff Officer in various gradations. Duncan would earn a second Mention in Despatches during the Waziristan campaign of 1936–1939. He took command of the 45th Indian Infantry Brigade in June 1941.

During the retreat from the Muar River in Malaya on 19 January 1941, Duncan was concussed during an air attack on his headquarters. The following day, during an attempt to break out of a Japanese encirclement in concert with Australian forces, he was killed while mounting a bayonet charge against a Japanese attack on the brigade's rear. Duncan is buried in the Kranji War Cemetery in Singapore.

References

External links
Generals of World War II

1895 births
1942 deaths
Military personnel from Lanarkshire
Seaforth Highlanders officers
British Army personnel of World War I
Indian Army personnel of World War I
People from British Malaya
Military of Singapore under British rule
British Indian Army officers
Indian Army personnel killed in World War II
Burials at Kranji War Cemetery
British military personnel of the Third Anglo-Afghan War